Lure may refer to:

Objects
 Lure (falconry), a chase object used in falconry
 Fishing lure, an object to attract fish
 Lur or Lure, a musical instrument
 Bait (luring substance), the substance used in luring

Geography

Albania
 Lurë, a municipality in the Dibër district, in Albania
 Lurë National Park

France
 Lure, Haute-Saône, a commune in the department of Haute-Saône
 Arrondissement of Lure, an arrondissement in the department of Haute-Saône
 Luré, a commune in the Loire department

United States
 Lake Lure, North Carolina

Film and television
The Lure (1914 film), an American melodrama on prostitution
The Lure (1933 film), a British film
The Lure (2015 film), a Polish film
"The Lure", a 1967 episode of Gunsmoke

Books
The Lure, a 1912 book by Lady E. S. Drower
The Lure, a 1979 book by Felice Picano
The Lure, a 2002 book by  Bill Napier
Lure, a 2003 book by Dilys Rose
The Lure, a 2014 book by Lynne Ewing

Other uses
 Lure (horse), a racehorse
 Laboratoire pour l'utilisation du rayonnement électromagnétique, the operator of the SOLEIL synchrotron in Orsay, France

See also
 
 Lur, Iran (disambiguation)
 Lurs (disambiguation)